The Burne-Jones Baronetcy, of Rottingdean in the County of Sussex, and of The Grange in the Parish of Fulham in the County of London, was a title in the Baronetage of the United Kingdom. It was created on 4 May 1894 for the artist and designer Edward Burne-Jones. He was closely associated with the later phase of the Pre-Raphaelite movement. He was succeeded by his eldest son, the second Baronet, who was also a painter. The title became extinct on his death in 1926.

Burne-Jones baronets, of Rottingdean and of The Grange (1894)
Sir Edward Coley Burne-Jones, 1st Baronet (1833–1898)
Sir Philip Burne-Jones, 2nd Baronet (1861–1926)

References

Extinct baronetcies in the Baronetage of the United Kingdom